Bertrand de Five Pranger (born 28 May 1950 in Barcelona), also known as Beltrand de Five Pranger, is a swimmer from Spain.  He competed at the 1972 Summer Paralympics, winning a silver in two different swimming races. He competed at the 1976 Summer Paralympics, winning a gold in one swimming race and silver in a different swimming race.

References

External links 
 
 

1950 births
Living people
Spanish male freestyle swimmers
Paralympic swimmers of Spain
Paralympic gold medalists for Spain
Paralympic silver medalists for Spain
Paralympic medalists in swimming
Swimmers at the 1972 Summer Paralympics
Swimmers at the 1976 Summer Paralympics
Medalists at the 1972 Summer Paralympics
Medalists at the 1976 Summer Paralympics
Swimmers from Barcelona